Efiong Okon Akwa is a Nigerian lawyer who served as a sole administrator of Niger Delta Development Commission (NDDC) from December 2020 to October 2022. He was awarded ICAN Merit Award in 2022.

Education 
Efiong Akwa attended Rivers State University of Science and Technology where he earned a bachelor and master’s degrees in Law before proceeding to Nnamdi Azikiwe University, Akwa, for a doctorate degree in International Environmental Law. In 2008, he enrolled in Wharton Business School, University of Pennsylvania, Philadelphia, USA for a course in International Housing, Finance and Mortgage Securitization. Akwa attended Senior Executive Programme on Strategy, Leadership and Transformation at London Business School, London.

Career 
Akwa is a lawyer and solicitor of the Supreme Court of Nigeria. He is a Fellow of the Institute of Chartered Accountant of Nigeria and a Fellow of the Chartered Institute of Bankers of Nigeria. He had a career in banking and was a regional manager CDB Plc (since renamed First City Monument Bank, FCMB) South-South of Nigeria. After leaving the bank, he served as special assistant to Akwa Ibom State governor Godswill Akpabio and was later appointed to NDDC as acting executive director finance. He served in this position for four months when President Muhammadu Buhari appointed him interim sole administrator of the NDDC to oversee Forensic Audit of the commission's operations. He was credited for completing several abandoned projects initiated by the commission including the commission’s corporate headquarters in Port Harcourt, 1,050 bed hostel in the University of Uyo, donated Gunboats to Nigerian Army and provided electricity substation to a community in Ondo State. He was relieved of his appointment in October 2022 following the conclusion of his assignment.

References 

Nigerian lawyers
21st-century Nigerian lawyers
Rivers State University alumni
Nnamdi Azikiwe University alumni
Nigerian bankers